Paderborn University is one of the fourteen public research universities in the state of North Rhine-Westphalia in Germany. It was founded in 1972 and 20,308 students were enrolled at the university in the wintersemester 2016/2017.
It offers 62 different degree programmes.

The university has several winners of the Gottfried Wilhelm Leibniz Prize awarded by the German Research Foundation (DFG) and ERC grant recipients of the European Research Council. In 2002, the Romanian mathematician Preda Mihăilescu proved the Catalan conjecture, a number-theoretical conjecture, formulated by the French and Belgian mathematician Eugène Charles Catalan, which had stood unresolved for 158 years.
The University Closely Collaborates with the Heinz Nixdorf Institute, Paderborn Center for Parallel Computing and two Fraunhofer Institutes for research in Computer Science, Mathematics, Electrical Engineering and Quantum Photonics.

In 2018, world record for "optical data transmission at 128 gigabits per second" was achieved at the Heinz Nixdorf Institute of the University of Paderborn. The academic ranking of world universities 2018, popularly known as "shanghai rankings" placed the university in the ranking bracket 50–75 among mathematics departments worldwide.

Campus 
Paderborn University has two campuses:
 The main campus and
 The campus on Fürstenallee
Main campus

The main campus is located at Warburger Straße in Paderborn. Paderborn University owns two student halls of residence, both of which are just off the main campus. The main campus also houses the library.

International Office
The international office of Paderborn University is interconnected with over 140 partner universities worldwide and offers exchange programs. The international office works closely with the student organization Eurobiz e.V. which looks after incoming exchange students.

Fürstenallee
The Fürstenallee campus is located 5 km from the main campus and is connected to the main campus via the 'uni-line' bus. Some academic activities of the computer science and Systems engineering departments are held at the Fürstenallee campus. Next to the Fürstenallee building is the world's biggest computer museum, the Heinz Nixdorf Museum Forum. The Fürstenallee campus houses the research centers such as Heinz Nixdorf Institute, Cooperative Computing and Communication Laboratory (C-Lab) and Software quality lab (S-lab).

Academics

In 2006, the computer science program was ranked among the top 3 programs in the most comprehensive and detailed ranking of German universities by the Centre for Higher Education Development (CHE) and the German weekly news magazine "Die Zeit". In the same year, the university was ranked among the leading institutions in terms of gaining research funds in the areas of electrical engineering, computer science and systems engineering by the German Research Foundation.

The interdisciplinary research centers at the university include Heinz Nixdorf Institute, Paderborn center for Parallel Computing, Paderborn Institute for Scientific Computation, Cooperative Computing and Communication Laboratory (C-Lab) and Software quality lab (S-lab). RailCab is a research project by Paderborn University. Its purpose is the examination of the use of linear engines for the propulsion of autonomous, rail mounted vehicles.

See also 
 List of early modern universities in Europe

References

External links

   

 
Educational institutions established in 1972
1972 establishments in Germany
Universities and colleges in North Rhine-Westphalia